= Osummit =

- Location within Gauteng Location within South Africa
- Coordinates: 26.069°S 27.996°E
- Country: South Africa
- Province: Gauteng
- Municipality: City of Johannesburg
- Time zone: UTC+2 (SAST)
- Postal code (street): 2194

Osummit is a suburb of Johannesburg, South Africa. It is located in Region B of the City of Johannesburg Metropolitan Municipality.

== History ==
The suburb is situated on part of an old Witwatersrand farm called Driefontein. It was established on 5 June 1957.
